The African black swift (Apus barbatus), also known as the African swift or black swift, is a medium-sized bird in the swift family. It breeds in Africa discontinuously from Liberia, Cameroon, Zaire, Uganda and Kenya southwards to South Africa. The "black swifts" of Madagascar and the Comoros are either taken as two subspecies of the African black swift, or otherwise deemed a full species, the Malagasy black swift.

Distinctive features

It has a short forked tail and very long swept-back wings that resemble a crescent or a boomerang. This species is very similar to the common swift but can be distinguished under optimum viewing conditions by the contrast between its black back and paler secondary wing feathers. The heavier build also gives it a distinctive flight action, which consisted of a steady level flight interspersed with short glides.

Habitat
This species feeds readily over lowland, and can form very large flocks, often with other gregarious swifts.

Movements
The nominate South African subspecies is migratory, wintering further north. Other subspecies are resident. Of the other seven accepted forms, the most widespread is the small and dark A. b. subsp. roehli of east Africa.

Two other dark races, A. b. balstoni and A. b. mayottensis (see: Malagasy black swift), are restricted to Madagascar and the Comoro Islands respectively. It has been suggested that some balstoni migrate to the continental mainland when not breeding, but this has not been proved.

Nesting
East African birds nest in hollow trees, whereas in South Africa this species uses cliffs, usually inland but also on the coast. The African black swift is a colonial breeder, sometimes forming mixed colonies with alpine swifts. The nest is a shallow grass cup glued to the substrate with saliva, and the typical clutch is one or two eggs.

Call
The call is a strident double-rasped, hissing scream zzzzzzzZZZTT, dissimilar to that of its confusion species.

References

Sources
 Sinclair, Hockey and Tarboton, SASOL Birds of Southern Africa,

External links

 African black swift – Species text in The Atlas of Southern African Birds

African black swift
African black swift
African black swift
Birds of Southern Africa
African black swift
African black swift